Peluca is a short film by director Jared Hess, produced for an assignment while attending Brigham Young University in 2002. It was shown at the 2003 Slamdance Film Festival.

The film is almost nine minutes long and was shot on black-and-white 16mm film. It stars Jon Heder as the main character, Seth. The film's title is the Spanish word for "wig", referring to the wig that is purchased in the film. 
The short was later adapted into the 2004 film Napoleon Dynamite, which featured Heder as the title character. The short appears as a special feature on the DVD.

Plot
The film follows its main character, Seth (Jon Heder), as he skips school with two of his friends, Pedro and Giel, to attempt to buy a lottery ticket at the convenience store and shop at a local thrift store, where they find a wig for Giel (who shaved his head after catching a fever). Later, they return to the school, and Seth leaves to go to an FFA contest.

Cast
 Jon Heder as Seth
 Greg Hansen as Pedro
 Chris Sanchez as Giel

Production
Peluca was shot in black-and-white on 16mm film. It was filmed in locations around Hess' hometown of Preston, Idaho, including Preston High School and a local D.I. store. The film was completed in two days with a budget of under $500.

Legacy
The Seth character was later adapted into the titular character of the 2004 feature film Napoleon Dynamite. Heder also played Napoleon.

The characters of Giel and Pedro are combined in Napoleon Dynamite as the character Pedro Sanchez.

Nearly all elements and locations from Peluca are used in the film (the convenience store scene was deleted from the final cut, however).

References

External links

 

2002 films
2002 short films
Napoleon Dynamite
American student films
Films directed by Jared Hess
2000s English-language films